Syedd Annwar is an Indian actor and television producer. In 2011, he made acting and production debut in Tamil television with Pirivom Santhippom under his banner Evergreen Productions along with him introducing Kalyani, Rachitha Mahalakshmi and Dinesh Goplalsamy. The same year he produced Saravanan Meenatchi which was a popular serial featuring the hit pair of 2007 serial Madurai Michi Senthil, Sreeja Chandran in the lead titular roles and along with them he also appeared in a brief supporting role. In 2013, he acted in the serial Thayumanavan. In 2016, he started to act in the serial Pagal Nilavu along with his fiancé Sameera  Sherief, Vignesh Karthick and Soundarya Bala Nandakumar.

In 2017, he started acting in a supporting role in “Rekka Katti Parakuthu Manasu” telecasted in Zee Tamil produced by M/s Orange Media Production.

In 2018, he produced the serial ‘Ponmagal Vanthal” telecasted in Star Vijay produced under the banner M/s Syed Studios, which is off-air now. On the personal front he married his Pagal Nilavu co-star Sameer Sherief in 2019. The couple have a son born on 4 September 2021

Filmography

Actor

Producer

Awards and honours

References

Living people
Tamil male television actors
Television personalities from Tamil Nadu
Male actors in Tamil cinema
21st-century Tamil male actors
Male actors from Hyderabad, India
1991 births